CLG Thuar Mhic Éadaigh is a Gaelic football club located in western County Mayo.

Honours
 Connacht Intermediate Club Football Championship 2006
 Connacht Junior Club Football Championship: 1998
 Mayo Intermediate Football Championship:  1982, 2006, 2010
 Mayo Junior Football Championship: 1979, 1998
 Mayo Senior Ladies Football Championship: 1982
 Mayo Intermediate Ladies Football Championship: 2001
 Mayo Junior Ladies Football Championship: 1994, 2010

References

External links
Club Website
Club Facebook page

Gaelic football clubs in County Mayo
Gaelic games clubs in County Mayo